Francisco Peguero Báez (born June 1, 1988) is a Dominican professional baseball outfielder for the Acereros de Monclova of the Mexican League. He played in MLB for the San Francisco Giants from 2012 through 2013.

Professional career

San Francisco Giants
Peguero began his professional career in 2006, playing for the DSL Giants, hitting .275 with four home runs and 16 RBI in 56 games. He played for the DSL Giants in 2007 as well, hitting .294 with 25 stolen bases in 69 games.

In 2008, Peguero played for two teams - the Salem-Keizer Volcanoes and Augusta Greenjackets. That season, he hit a combined .285 with four home runs, 43 RBI and 25 stolen bases in 100 games.

He spent 2009 with the Volcanoes and Greenjackets, hitting .353 with one home run, 46 RBI and 22 stolen bases in 75 games.

Peguero got a late start this season after an injury in spring training. He batted .324 in San Jose before joining the Richmond Flying Squirrels on June 23, where he has played 71 games with a .309 average, 5 home runs, 37 RBIs, 34 runs scored and 8 stolen bases.

In 2012, Peguero played for the Triple-A Fresno Grizzlies. In August he had a 22-game hitting streak.  On August 25, 2012, Peguero was called up to the majors and made his major league debut, starting and playing left field in a game against the Atlanta Braves.  He got his first major league base hit September 23 with an infield single in the 4th inning against the San Diego Padres.

Peguero was designated for assignment on November 27, 2013. He became a free agent on December 2, 2013 after being non-tendered by the Giants.

Baltimore Orioles
Peguero signed with the Baltimore Orioles on December 7, 2013. He became a free agent following the 2014 season.

Tigres de Quintana Roo
On February 13, 2015, Peguero signed with the Tigres de Quintana Roo of the Mexican Baseball League.

Acereros de Monclova
On October 21, 2015, Peguero was traded to the Acereros de Monclova of the Mexican Baseball League. He was released on February 21, 2017.

Toyama GRN Thunderbirds
On March 6, 2017, he signed with the Toyama GRN Thunderbirds of the Baseball Challenge League.
On September 10, 2017, he broke the Baseball Challenge League single- season hit record of 113, set by Yuya Nohara in 2007, getting his 114.

Chiba Lotte Marines
On February 16, 2018, he signed with Chiba Lotte Marines of Nippon Professional Baseball (NPB). He played fifty games with the farm team, before he was placed on waivers on June 29, 2018.

Acereros de Monclova (second stint)
On June 29, 2018, Peguero signed with the Acereros de Monclova of the Mexican League. He appeared in 52 games for Monclova down the stretch, hitting .368/.416/.637 with 13 home runs and 60 RBI. Peguero played in 115 games for the Acereros in 2019, slashing .370/.430/.613 with 38 home runs, 133 RBI, and 9 stolen bases. Peguero did not play in a game in 2020 due to the cancellation of the Mexican League season because of the COVID-19 pandemic.

Peguero did not play for the team in 2021 after suffering a wrist fracture, and saw sparse action in 2022 due to injury. In just 38 games that season, he hit .262/.356/.454 with 6 home runs and 23 RBI.

References

External links

1988 births
Living people
Acereros de Monclova players
Arizona League Giants players
Augusta GreenJackets players
Dominican Republic expatriate baseball players in Japan
Dominican Republic expatriate baseball players in Mexico
Dominican Republic expatriate baseball players in the United States
Dominican Summer League Giants players
Fresno Grizzlies players
Gigantes del Cibao players

Major League Baseball players from the Dominican Republic
Major League Baseball left fielders
Major League Baseball right fielders
Mexican League baseball center fielders
Mexican League baseball right fielders
Naranjeros de Hermosillo players
Nippon Professional Baseball outfielders
Norfolk Tides players
People from San Cristóbal Province
Richmond Flying Squirrels players
San Francisco Giants players
Salem-Keizer Volcanoes players
San Jose Giants players
Tigres de Quintana Roo players